Michael Edward Adeane, Baron Adeane,  (30 September 1910 – 30 April 1984) was Private Secretary to Elizabeth II for 19 years, between 1953 and 1972.

Early life and education
Adeane was the son of Captain Henry Robert Augustus Adeane (1882–1914), by his wife Hon. Victoria Eugenie Bigge (d.1969). His paternal grandfather was Admiral Edward Stanley Adeane, from a family of landed gentry tracing their ancestry to a Simon Adeane who died in 1686; his maternal grandfather was Arthur Bigge, 1st Baron Stamfordham, Private Secretary to Queen Victoria and King George V. Adeane was educated at Eton College and graduated from Magdalene College, Cambridge in 1934 with a Master of Arts degree.

Career
After graduating, Adeane travelled to Canada. He was aide-de-camp to Lord Bessborough, Governor General of Canada from 1934 to 1935, and then to his successor, Lord Tweedsmuir, until 1936.

Adeane then returned to Britain and became George VI's Assistant Private Secretary from 1945 after five-and-a-half years on active military duty, a post he held until the latter's death in 1952. He continued in that post for Queen Elizabeth until 1953 when he was promoted to Private Secretary and admitted to the Privy Council.

In 1961, during a Royal visit to Nepal, Adeane was credited with a share of a tiger kill with Sir Christopher Bonham-Carter in a royal tiger hunt. The tiger-shooting role had fallen to him after the Queen had declined, the Duke of Edinburgh had been unable to shoot due to having his trigger finger in a splint, and the then Foreign Secretary Alec Douglas-Home had missed twice.

Personal life
On 10 January 1939 Adeane married Helen Chetwynd-Stapleton (1916 – 1994),  and they had a daughter and a son. Their son, Edward Adeane, a barrister, was Private Secretary to the Prince of Wales from 1979 to 1984.

On 30 April 1984 Adeane died of heart failure in Aberdeen, Scotland. He was cremated at Golders Green Crematorium.

Honours
Adeane was appointed a Member of the Royal Victorian Order (MVO) in 1946, a Companion of the Order of the Bath (CB) in 1947, he was promoted to Knight Commander of the Royal Victorian Order (KCVO) in 1951, and Knight Commander of the Order of the Bath (KCB) in 1955. In 1962 he was promoted to Knight Grand Cross of the Royal Victorian Order (GCVO) and in 1968 to Knight Grand Cross of the Order of the Bath (GCB). He also received the Royal Household Long and Faithful Service Medal.

In 1959, Adeane received the Grand Decoration in Gold with Sash for Services to the Republic of Austria and on 20 April 1972, he was created a life peer as Baron Adeane, of Stamfordham in the County of Northumberland.

In popular culture
Adeane is portrayed on-screen in the Netflix original series The Crown by actor Will Keen. Following the recast of the series as of season 3, he is played by David Rintoul.

References

External links
 Lynam, Ruth.  "Tiger Hunt and Ring around a Rhino," Life, March 24, 1961, pp. 50–54.

1910 births
1984 deaths
Michael
Military personnel from London
Adeane, Michael Adeane, Baron
Assistant Private Secretaries to the Sovereign
British Army personnel of World War II
Coldstream Guards officers
Grand Crosses with Star and Sash of the Order of Merit of the Federal Republic of Germany
Knights Grand Cross of the Order of the Bath
Knights Grand Cross of the Royal Victorian Order
Life peers created by Elizabeth II
Adeane, Michael Adeane, Baron
People educated at Eton College
Private Secretaries to the Sovereign
Recipients of the Grand Decoration with Sash for Services to the Republic of Austria
Golders Green Crematorium